Luis Enrique Trujillo Ortiz (born December 27, 1990) is a Peruvian footballer who plays as a left back or winger for Cienciano in the Torneo Descentralizado.

Club career

Alianza Lima
Trujillo made his Torneo Descentralizado league debut for Alianza Lima in the last game of the 2007 season on December 16, 2007, at the age of 16. In his debut match, he started from the beginning and scored two goals to help Alianza win 6–0 at home against Deportivo Municipal.

On February 24, 2011, he was declared a free player since Alianza Lima did not pay his salary for three months.

Juan Aurich
On February 27, 2012, Trujillo joined Chiclayo-based club Juan Aurich for the start of the 2012 season. He joined as a free player and signed a two-year contract with the 2011 Descentralizado champions.

International career
Trujillo played for the Peru national football team at the 2007 FIFA U-17 World Cup in the Republic of Korea, and has moved up to play for the senior side in the 2010 FIFA World Cup qualifying rounds.

References

External links 

1990 births
Living people
People from Talara
Peruvian footballers
Peru international footballers
Club Alianza Lima footballers
Juan Aurich footballers
Sport Huancayo footballers
Ayacucho FC footballers
Cienciano footballers
Peruvian Primera División players
Association football fullbacks
Association football wingers
Association football utility players